Alonzo E. Horton is a statue of the American real estate developer of the same name, installed at the intersection of Third Avenue and E Street (Broadway Circle), across from San Diego's Westfield Horton Plaza, in the U.S. state of California.

References

External links

 Statue of Alonzo E. Horton at Horton Plaza (2010), San Diego Reader

Outdoor sculptures in San Diego
Sculptures of men in California
Statues in San Diego